Edward T. Conroy (January 31, 1929 – May 24, 1982) was an attorney and state senator in Maryland. In 1980, he was the Democratic Party candidate for U.S. Senate.

He served as National Commander of the Disabled American Veterans from 1971 to 1972.

Legacy
The Edward T. Conroy Memorial Scholarship Program was created in his memory.

References

1982 deaths
1929 births
20th-century American politicians
Democratic Party Maryland state senators